Gregory Stuart "Greg" Clark (July 19, 1947 – November 30, 2012) was an American politician who served in the Vermont House of Representatives. He was a member of the  Republican Party. He represented the Addison-3 Representative District.

On November 30, 2012, Clark was killed by a driver while clearing snow and ice on his windshield on the shoulder of Route 7 in Waltham, Vermont. He was on his way to work at Mount Abraham Union High School, where he had taught for nearly 20 years.

References

1947 births
2012 deaths
Republican Party members of the Vermont House of Representatives
Place of birth missing
Road incident deaths in Vermont
Pedestrian road incident deaths